Labeobarbus huloti is a species of ray-finned fish in the  family Cyprinidae.
It is found in Democratic Republic of the Congo and Uganda.
Its natural habitat is rivers.

References

huloti
Taxa named by Keith Edward Banister
Fish described in 1976
Taxonomy articles created by Polbot